Chris Bacon is an American composer. His film scores include Alpha and Omega (2010), Source Code (2011), Gnomeo & Juliet (2011), Sherlock Gnomes (2018) and Men in Black: International (2019). He was the composer for all 50 episodes of the A&E drama series Bates Motel, for which he was nominated for an Emmy Award, and also composed the music for 26 of the 32 episodes of the NBC musical drama series Smash.

Early life 

As a youth Bacon learned to play piano and saxophone, and from an early age he knew he wanted to be a film composer. He has said, "From the point that I could start thinking about what I wanted to do when I grew up... it was always to write movie music."

Bacon cites his internship with Howard as his most valuable musical training, "While I learned a ton from school, my real-world education came under James. It felt like I was on scholarship because I was being paid to learn what it means to be a film composer at the pinnacle of the industry. James gave me my first opportunities on projects that he couldn’t fully take on for a variety of reasons, and his endorsement was very comforting to producers who appreciated the work still being performed under his 'umbrella'."

Career 

Bacon's solo debut as a film composer came with the 2007 Lifetime film Angels Fall, for which he composed the main theme. Bacon's first solo feature film score was the thriller Source Code.

Bacon has also contributed music to many film and TV productions, including American Hustle, Avengers: Age of Ultron, and Goosebumps. Bacon's next project is the Amazon reboot of The Tick, directed by Wally Pfister.

Bacon has been nominated for two Emmy Awards: one for his work on the NBC series Smash, and the other for is work on the A&E series Bates Motel.

Filmography 

 Angels Fall (2007), composed with Stuart Michael Thomas
 Blue Smoke (2007), composed with Stuart Michael Thomas
 Space Chimps (2008)
 Northern Lights (2009), composed with Stuart Michael Thomas
 Midnight Bayou (2009), composed with Stuart Michael Thomas
 Waking Sleeping Beauty (2009)
 Love Ranch (2010)
 Alpha and Omega (2010)
 Beethoven's Christmas Adventure (2011)
 Source Code (2011)
 Gnomeo & Juliet (2011), composed with James Newton Howard
 Wonder Woman (2011)
 High Ground (2012)
 Atlas Shrugged II: The Strike (2012)
 The Visitant (2014)
 Being Charlie (2015)
 When We Rise (2017), composed with Danny Elfman
 Snatched (2017), composed with Theodore Shapiro
 Sherlock Gnomes (2018)
 Men in Black: International (2019), composed with Danny Elfman
 Super Gidget (2019)
 Doctor Strange in the Multiverse of Madness (2022) (additional music) score composed by Danny Elfman
 Wednesday (2022), composed with Danny Elfman
 65 (2023)

References

External links 

 

American film score composers
Living people
American male film score composers